The Rivière de Cayenne ("Cayenne River") is a river in French Guiana, formed by the Rivière des Cascades, Tonnegrande, and Montsinéry River. It flows into the Atlantic Ocean near the city of Cayenne, forming an estuary about 2 km long.

The river featured prominently in both the movie and the book Papillon by Henri Charrière.

See also
List of rivers of French Guiana
List of rivers of the Americas by coastline

References

Rivers of French Guiana
Rivers of France